The White Dwarf is a human powered dirigible that has set several world records.

Design
The White Dwarf set several world records with pilot (and engine) Bryan Allen. The dirigible features a teardrop shaped lift bag. The aluminum fuselage is a truss design with a single pilot seat on top with a chain driven pusher propeller positioned in front of a rudder.

Operational history
The White Dwarf was flown  in 8 hours and 50 minutes.

Specifications (White Dwarf)

References

Further reading
Clément-Bayard No.1

External links
YouTube Video of White Dwarf

Airships
Homebuilt aircraft
Human-powered aircraft
Single-engined pusher aircraft